Josef Koll (born 2 December 1955) is an Austrian biathlete. He competed in the relay event at the 1980 Winter Olympics.

References

1955 births
Living people
Austrian male biathletes
Olympic biathletes of Austria
Biathletes at the 1980 Winter Olympics
Sportspeople from Upper Austria
People from Urfahr-Umgebung District